Puppets is a 1916 American short drama film directed by Tod Browning.

Cast
 DeWolf Hopper Sr. as Pantaloon (as DeWolf Hopper)
 Jack Brammall as Harlequin
 Robert Lawler as Clown
 Pauline Starke as Columbine
 Kate Toncray as The Widow
 Edward Bolles as Pierrot
 Max Davidson as Scaramouche

References

External links

1916 films
1916 drama films
1916 short films
American silent short films
American black-and-white films
Films directed by Tod Browning
Silent American drama films
1910s American films
1910s English-language films